The men's 800 metres at the 2012 World Junior Championships in Athletics was held at the Estadi Olímpic Lluís Companys on 13, 14, and 15 July.

Medalists

Records
, the existing world junior and championship records were as follows.

Results

Heats

Qualification: The first 3 of each heat (Q) and the 3 fastest times (q) qualified

Semi-final

Qualification: The first 2 of each heat (Q) and the 2 fastest times (q) qualified

Final

Participation
According to an unofficial count, 60 athletes from 41 countries participated in the event.

References

External links
WJC12 800 metres schedule

800 metres
800 metres at the World Athletics U20 Championships